Pyaara Dushman is a 1980 Bollywood Hindi movie. Produced by Subhash Sagar it is directed by Anand Sagar. The film stars Amjad Khan, Rakesh Roshan, Vinod Mehra, Vidya Sinha, Yogeeta Bali and Sarika. The film's music is by Bappi Lahiri who composed a couple of popular songs like "Ek Dhoondho Milte Hain Hazaaron" and "Hari Om Hari".

The soundtrack includes the song "Hari Om Hari", which is picturized on Kalpana Iyer, and is inspired by Eruption's version of "One Way Ticket".

Cast 
 Amjad Khan as Shivnath / Shiv Prasad "Shiva"
 Rakesh Roshan as Raja
 Vinod Mehra as Inspector Amar
 Vidya Sinha as Rani
 Yogeeta Bali as Geeta
 Sarika as Reema
 Suresh Oberoi as Vicky

Soundtrack

References

External links 
 

1980 films
1980s Hindi-language films
Films scored by Bappi Lahiri